Fraser Cartmell (born 16 June 1982 in Inverness, Scotland) is a professional triathlete, multiple Scottish champion, three time Ironman 70.3 UK winner, and Ironman UK 2010 winner.

Results

External links 
 FraserCartmell.com – Fraser Cartmell official website
 tri247.com – Fraser Cartmell tri247.com interview

1982 births
Living people
Scottish male triathletes
Sportspeople from Inverness